Tentaspina orienta is a moth of the family Erebidae first described by Michael Fibiger in 2011. It is found in Indonesia (it was described from eastern Java).

The wingspan is about 11 mm. The forewings are brown, but black at the base of the costa and the upper medial area. There are small black dots subapically on the costa. The crosslines are weakly defined, except for the dark brown, waved subterminal line and the fringes. The terminal line is indicated by black interveinal dots. The hindwings are grey. The underside of the forewings is unicolorous brown and the underside of the hindwings is grey with a discal spot.

References

Micronoctuini
Moths described in 2011
Taxa named by Michael Fibiger